Tai (Tay, Ti) is a Kalam language of Papua New Guinea, spoken in a single village.

References

Kalam languages
Languages of Madang Province